José Miguel Echavarri García (born 10 October 1947 in Abárzuza) is a Spanish former racing cyclist who was the team manager for  from its inception in 1980 as Reynolds until 2008 as Caisse d'Epargne.

Major results
Sources:
1970
 8th Clásica de Sabiñánigo
 10th Grand Prix Navarre

References

External links 
 

1947 births
Living people
Spanish male cyclists
Movistar Team (men's team)
People from Estella Oriental
Cyclists from Navarre
Directeur sportifs